ARA El Plata was the first of two s built in Britain in the 1870s for the Argentine Navy.

Description
She displaced , and her crew numbered 120 officers and enlisted men.

History

See also 
 List of ships of the Argentine Navy

References

Notes

Bibliography

External links 
 

1875 ships
El Plata-class monitors
Ships built in Leamouth